The Cult Is Alive is the 11th studio album by the Norwegian black metal band Darkthrone. It was released 27 February 2006 by Peaceville Records. This album represented a shift in the band's style, as they incorporated more punk and crust punk traits. Drummer Fenriz stated, "Call it black metal or evil rock, I don't care..."

Track listing

Credits
Nocturno Culto – electric guitar, bass guitar, vocals
Fenriz – drums, vocals on "Graveyard Slut", backing vocals on "Forebyggende krig", rhythm guitar on "Tyster på Gud"

Charts

References

Darkthrone albums
2006 albums
Peaceville Records albums